The Aubach is an orographically left tributary of the River Wiehl in the German state of North Rhine-Westphalia.

Geography 
It initially flows in a north-westerly direction. In the Pfänderwiese, another tributary, flows from the left into the Aubach. Further to the north, the Aubach reaches the Aubachtal.

It continues in a north-easterly direction until the Aubach reaches Wildbergerhütte. The Aubach river then turns north-west and reaches the centre of Wildbergerhütte, along the pond dam.

Flora 
The vegetation on the banks of the Aubach River changes along its course. The upper course of the Aubach valley is characterised by dense, shady forests, under which only a sparse layer of herbs flourishes. The middle course is characterised by Alder and Willow species, but also neophytes such as the Reynoutria japonica can be found. Wild herbaceous plants can also be found on the banks of the Aubach River, such as Anemone sylvestris or Ficaria verna.

Flood 
On 3 May 2001, torrential rainfall led to flooding, referred to as the flood of the century. Between 16 and 20 o'clock, 110 litres of precipitation per square metre fell. The monthly average in NRW is only 100 litres.

References

External links 
 Steckbrief Reichshof

Rivers of North Rhine-Westphalia
Rivers of Germany